Big Ticket Television, Inc. (also known as Big Ticket Entertainment and Big Ticket Pictures) is an American production company. Big Ticket is a subsidiary of CBS Studios (formerly CBS Paramount Television and CBS Television Studios), a division of Paramount Global.  It is best known for producing the syndicated mainstay Judge Judy from 1996 to 2021

History

The company was launched on October 21, 1994 under the Spelling Entertainment Group, who named former Warner Bros. Television and Spelling Television executive Larry Lyttle to run the division. Lyttle wanted to name the company as Blockbuster Television, named after its parent company Blockbuster, Inc., but Viacom opposed the idea due to the chain's fate being unclear. Viacom by that time owned Blockbuster Inc. and its 67% stake in Spelling Entertainment Group since September 29.  Lyttle chose the name "Big Ticket" by driving by a Blockbuster store and noting Blockbuster's "big ticket" logo. Big Ticket was created primarily as an outlet for non-drama TV series from Spelling, which was largely known for hit dramas at that time. All of its programming was distributed by Spelling's syndication arm, Worldvision Enterprises, until Worldvision was folded into Paramount Domestic Television, later CBS Television Distribution, and now CBS Media Ventures.

In 1999, Spelling Entertainment was bought out by Viacom Productions, resulting in Paramount Domestic Television (which Viacom had owned since its 1994 acquisition of Paramount Pictures) becoming Big Ticket's distributor in June 1999. On June 29, 2003, Paramount Television combined Big Ticket Television's production operations with its network and syndication outputs after Lyttle left before his final year was over. In 2006, PDT became CBS Paramount Domestic Television and later CBS Media Ventures (formerly CBS Television Distribution) in 2007.

Productions

Bruce Kerner and Mark Johnson worked on shows produced by Big Ticket from 1995 to 2002 when Night Stand with Dick Dietrick premiered, Johnson also worked on Wolf Lake, Kerner also worked on The Terminator directed by James Cameron and starring Arnold Schwarzenegger.

From 2002 to 2004, Big Ticket produced The Jamie Kennedy Experiment for The WB created by Mad TV creators Fax Bahr and Adam Small & starring Blockbuster Entertainment Award winner Jamie Kennedy who is best known for playing Randy Meeks in the Scream franchise. The Jamie Kennedy Experiment was also a co-production with Warner Bros. Television Larry Lyttle also worked at Warner Bros. Television Studios before joining Spelling Television and running Big Ticket Television.

Big Ticket's most widely viewed productions are the courtroom series Judge Judy (ended in 2021) and Judge Joe Brown (ended in 2013), with the former debuting in 1996 and the latter in 1998. This left Judge Judy as the company's only program in the 2013-14 television season, although most of the production is done by CBS as the company has been largely a figurehead organization since the CBS takeover of Viacom's television unit. In Fall 2014, Big Ticket also began to produce the three-judge court show Hot Bench, which is created and executive-produced by Judge Judy Sheindlin through her own production company, Queen Bee Productions.

Big Ticket also produced the sitcom Moesha, its spin-off The Parkers and the stop-motion animated comedy Gary & Mike for UPN, the dramas Hack created by David Koepp & starring David Morse and Wolf Lake created by John Leekly & starring Lou Diamond Phillips for CBS (only five episodes of the latter aired on CBS before cancellation, but all nine were shown on UPN), and the talk show parody Night Stand with Dick Dietrick for syndication. For the second (and final) season of the court series Swift Justice, Big Ticket became the production company after the series moved from Atlanta to Los Angeles and shared a studio with Judge Judy and Judge Joe Brown. The company's most recent production is The Drew Barrymore Show, which launched on September 14, 2020. As of the 2021–22 television season, Hot Bench and The Drew Barrymore Show are the only programs produced by the company that are still in production. Plus on Pluto TV

References

Television production companies of the United States
Paramount Global subsidiaries
American companies established in 1994
Mass media companies established in 1994